"Hold Me" is a 1987 song by Sheila E., and the first single released from her third album, Sheila E.. The song is an R&B ballad and the B-side is the non-album track "The World Is High".

Chart positions
was an R&B hit, peaking at No. 3 on the U.S. R&B singles chart. On the Billboard Hot 100, it reached No. 68.

Formats and track listings
U.S. 7"
 "Hold Me" (edit) – 4:10
 "The World Is High" – 3:25

U.S. 12"
 "Hold Me" (album) – 5:04
 "The World Is High" – 3:25

References

1987 singles
Sheila E. songs
Paisley Park Records singles
Songs written by Sheila E.
1986 songs